Richard Kinon (August 17, 1924 – March 11, 2004) was an American television director.
Born in Brooklyn borough of New York City, New York, he was hired at his beginning by the studio in Hollywood as a screenwriter.
The house he was living in until his death was built in the 1920s and used to belong to his parents.
For many years he stayed on the French Riviera.

Kinon died on March 11, 2004 (aged 79) in Beverly Hills, California.

Filmography 
 1956 : The Gale Storm Show (TV series)
 1957 : Mr. Adams and Eve (TV series)
 1960 : The Tab Hunter Show (TV series)
 1963 : The Farmer's Daughter (TV series)
 1963 : Burke's Law (TV series)
 1964 : Bewitched (TV series)
 1965 : I Dream of Jeannie (TV series)
 1966 : Love on a Rooftop (TV series)
 1966 : That Girl (TV series)
 1967 : Captain Nice (TV series)
 1967 : The Second Hundred Years (TV series)
 1967 : The Flying Nun (TV series)
 1970 : Nanny and the Professor (TV series)
 1970 : Arnie (TV series)
 1970 : Hogan’s Heroes (TV series)
 1971 : Getting Together (TV series)
 1971 : The Partridge Family (TV series)
 1972 : Me and the Chimp (TV series)
 1972 : Bridget Loves Bernie (TV series)
 1973 : The Girl with Something Extra (TV series)
 1975 : Barney Miller (TV series)
 1975 : Fay (TV series)
 1976 : The Love Boat (TV movie)
 1976 : Family (TV series)
 1976 : Holmes & Yo-Yo (TV series)
 1976 : The Practice (TV series)
 1977 : The Love Boat (TV series)
 1981 : Dynasty (TV series)
 1982 : Fame (TV series)
 1983 : Hotel (TV series)
 1985 : The Colbys (TV series)

Awards and nominations 
Kinon was nominated in 1959 for an Primetime Emmy Award for Best Direction of a Single Program of a Comedy Series for the Mr. Adams and Eve episode "The Interview" (1958).

References

External links
 

1924 births
2004 deaths
American television directors
People from Brooklyn